Wildfire Games is an independent free software video game developer, originally founded as a modding team in 2001. The logo is the Chinese character "火" (fire). Wildfire Games is currently developing 0 A.D., a real-time strategy game. In addition to game development, Wildfire Games has developed the Pyrogenesis game engine used in 0 A.D. and separate mods.

History
Wildfire Games began as a game modding studio for Age of Empires II. An idea for a mod, 0 A.D., became an independent game due to the limitations of Age of Empires.

Awards
 Top 100 Best Mods and Indies of 2008

References

External links

Video game development companies
Video game companies established in 2002